Ken Lemke (born c. 1951) is a politician in Alberta, Canada. He served as mayor of Stony Plain from 2007 to 2012. Lemke then went into provincial politics, and represented Stony Plain from 2012 to 2015, as a Progressive Conservative.

Political career
Lemke successfully ran for town councillor in 1995. He held this position for four terms, until deciding to take a run for mayor. Lemke was elected mayor of the Town of Stony Plain in 2007, and was acclaimed in 2010.

In November 2011, with Stony Plain MLA Fred Lindsay retiring, Lemke ran for the Progressive Conservative (PC) nomination. In the 2012 election, he won the Stony Plain riding, and successfully made his way into provincial politics. He held the seat until the 2015 election, when he was defeated by New Democrat Erin Babcock.

References

1950s births
Living people
Mayors of places in Alberta
Progressive Conservative Association of Alberta MLAs
21st-century Canadian politicians